California's 63rd State Assembly district is one of 80 California State Assembly districts. Since 2022, it has been represented by Republican Bill Essayli.

District profile
The district encompasses part of the Gateway Cities region, southeast of Los Angeles. The primarily suburban district consists of an L-shaped strip extending from Bell and Maywood in the northwest to Hawaiian Gardens in the southeast.

Los Angeles County – 4.7%
 Bell
 Cudahy
 Hawaiian Gardens
 Lakewood
 Long Beach – 12.9%
 Lynwood
 Maywood
 Paramount
 South Gate

Election results from statewide races

List of Assembly Members 
Due to redistricting, the 63rd district has been moved around different parts of the state. The current iteration resulted from the 2011 redistricting by the California Citizens Redistricting Commission.

Election results 1992–present

2022

2020

2018

2016

2014

2012

2010

2008

2006

2004

2002

2000

1998

1996

1994

1992

See also
California State Assembly
California State Assembly districts
Districts in California

References

External links
District map from the California Citizens Redistricting Commission

63
Government of Los Angeles County, California
Government in Long Beach, California
Bell, California
Lakewood, California
Lynwood, California
Maywood, California
Paramount, California
South Gate, California